Baranomys is an extinct genus of rodent from the Baranomyinae subfamily of Cricetidae family. It lived in Pliocene epoch, and its fossils have been found in Canada, Germany, Hungary, Slovakia, and Poland. It was an ancestor to modern Arvicolinae. The species was described for the first time by Theodor Kormos in 1933.

Species 
 Baranomys kowalskii Kretzoi, 1962
 Baranomys langenhani Heller, 1937
 Baranomys loczyi Kormos, 1933
 Baranomys longidens Kowalski, 1960

References 

Cricetidae
Pliocene mammals of Europe
Pliocene mammals of North America
Prehistoric rodents
Fossil taxa described in 1933